Nationality words link to articles with information on the nation's poetry or literature (for instance, Irish or France).

Events
 January 5 – The Turkish government announces it will posthumously restore the citizenship it had stripped from influential poet Nâzım Hikmet, a Marxist who died in 1963 as an exile in the Soviet Union.
 January 20 – Poet Elizabeth Alexander reads "Praise Song for the Day" at presidential inauguration of President Barack Obama.
 February 9 – Eritrean poet and broadcaster Yirgalem Fisseha Mebrahtu is arbitrarily arrested and begins 6 years imprisonment without trial.
 March 16 – Nicholas Hughes, 47, the son of the poets Ted Hughes (British poet laureate 1984–98) and Sylvia Plath, who famously committed suicide in 1963 when her son was a year old, hangs himself in his home in Alaska. He had suffered from depression.
 May 1 – Carol Ann Duffy is appointed Poet Laureate of the United Kingdom, the first woman appointed to the position in its 341-year history, a position that has been held by, among others, John Dryden (whom Charles II named the first official poet laureate ), Tennyson, Wordsworth and Cecil Day-Lewis. Duffy is also the first Scot and the first openly gay occupant of the post.
 May 5 – Posthumous publication of J. R. R. Tolkien's narrative poem The Legend of Sigurd and Gudrún in alliterative verse based on the 13th century Poetic Edda and probably written in the 1930s.
 May 16 & May 25 – Ruth Padel becomes the first female ever elected Professor of Poetry at the University of Oxford but resigns nine days later after she is alleged to have been involved in what some sources refer to as a smear campaign against Derek Walcott, her leading rival for the post.
 July 30 – Last Post, a poem by Carol Ann Duffy, the Poet Laureate of the United Kingdom, is read on the BBC Radio 4 programme Today. Commissioned by the BBC to mark the deaths of Henry Allingham and Harry Patch, two of the last three surviving British veterans of the World War I, it is read on the day of Allingham's funeral.
 September 18 – The film Bright Star, about John Keats and his relationship with Fanny Brawne, is released in the United States, and on November 6 in the United Kingdom. The film's title is a reference to a sonnet by Keats, "Bright star, would I were stedfast as thou art", written at the time of the love affair. Jane Campion directed the movie.
 A Room and a Half, a Russian film directed by Andrey Khrzhanovsky and based on the life of Russian–American poet Joseph Brodsky, is released. It is distributed in the United States in 2010.

Works published in English
Listed by nation where the work was first published and again by the poet's native land, if different; substantially revised works listed separately:

Australia
 Robert Adamson, The Best Australian Poems, Black Inc., anthology including works by Ivy Alvarez, Judith Beveridge, Sarah K. Bell, Jen Jewel Brown, Anne Elvey, Lisa Gorton, Clive James, Les Murray, Dorothy Porter, Peter Porter, Thomas Shapcott, Alex Skovron, John Tranter, and Chris Wallace-Crabbe.
 Stephen Edgar, Other Summers, 109 pp; Melbourne: Black Pepper, 
 Jennifer Harrison and Kate Waterhouse, editors, Motherlode: Australian Women's Poetry 1986 – 2008, 120 poets represented, 342 pp, Glebe, New South Wales: Puncher and Wattmann, anthology
 Emma Jones, The Striped World, winner of the 2009 Arts Queensland Judith Wright Calanthe Award; Faber and Faber
 Martin Langford:
 editor, Harbour City Poems: Sydney in Verse 1788–2008, Glebe, New South Wales: Puncher and Wattmann, anthology
 The Human Project: New and Selected Poems
 John Kinsella, The Penguin Anthology of Australian Poetry, Penguin Group (Australia)
 Les Murray, Killing the Black Dog, Black Inc., 
 Dorothy Porter, The Bee Hut, Black Inc., 
 Nathan Shepherdson, Apples With Human Skin, St. Lucia, Queensland: University of Queensland Press, 
 Alan Wearne, guest editor, The Best Australian Poetry 2009, University of Queensland Press, 
 Les Wicks  The Ambrosiacs (Island Press (Australia))
 editor, Guide to Sydney Beaches Meuse Press

Canada
 Margaret Avison, Listening: The Last Poems, posthumously published
 Robert Bringhurst, Selected Poems
 Jan Conn, Botero's Beautiful Horses, Brick Books
 Barry Dempster, Love Outlandish, Brick Books
 Kate Eichhorn and Heather Milne, editors, Prismatic Publics: Innovative Canadian Women's Poetry and Poetics, Coach House Books, ; an anthology of 15 poets: Nicole Brossard, Margaret Christakos, Susan Holbrook, Dorothy Trujillo Lusk, Karen Mac Cormack, Daphne Marlatt, Erín Moure, M. NourbeSe Philip, Sina Queyras, Lisa Robertson, Gail Scott, Nathalie Stephens, Catriona Strang, Rita Wong, and Rachel Zolf
 Kim Goldberg, Red Zone, Pig Squash Press
 Chris Hutchinson, Other People's Lives, Brick Books
 Adeena Karasick, Amuse Bouche
 Douglas Lochhead, Looking into Trees
 Jeanette Lynes, The New Blue Distance
 Susan Musgrave, When the World Is Not Our Home: Selected Poems, 1985–2000
 Soraya Peerbaye, Poems for the Advisory Committee on Antarctic Names
 Marguerite Pigeon, Inventory
 Sina Queyras, Expressway, Coach House Books
 James Reaney, The Essential James Reaney. Brian Bartlett, ed., Porcupine's Quill
 Laisha Rosnau, Lousy Explorers, Nightwood Editions
 Stephen Rowe, Never More There, Nightwood Editions
 Carolyn Smart, Hooked, Brick Books
 Carmine Starnino, This Way Out, Gaspereau Press
 Fred Wah, Is a Door
 David Zieroth, The Fly in Autumn, Harbour Publishing

India, Indian poetry in English
 Anju Makhija, E V Ramakrishan, editors, We Speak in Changing Languages: Indian Women Poets 1990–2007, anthology, New Delhi: Sahitya Akademi
 Anthony Theodore, The Song of My Dance and Dance of My Dreams, 
 Arundhathi Subramaniam, editor, Hot is the Moon: Poems and Stories of Women in Kannada, Tamil, Konkani And Tulu, anthology in various languages, with translations into English; Mumbai: Sparrow
 Eunice de Souza, A Necklace of Skulls, Collected Poems ( Poetry in English), New Delhi: Penguin
 Uddipana Goswami, We Called the River Red ( Poetry in English ), Authorspress
 Yash Sharma, Tale of a Virgin River, translated into English by Anil Sehgal from the original Dogri; released with a CD of six songs composed and sung by the poet's daughter, Seema Anil Sehgal, a prominent singer; published in Singapore

Ireland

 Michael Coady, Going by Water, Oldcastle, County Meath: Gallery Press
 Ray Givans, Tolstoy in Love, 82 pages, 
 Kerry Hardie, Only This Room, Oldcastle, County Meath: Gallery Press
 Ron Houchin, Museum Crows, 84 pages, Cliffs of Moher, County Clare: Salmon Press, 
 Dorothy Molloy, Long-distance Swimmer, 60 pages, Cliffs of Moher, County Clare: Salmon Press, posthumously published (died 2004)
 Paul Muldoon, Wayside Shrines, 40 pages, Oldcastle, County Meath: Gallery Press, 
 Eiléan Ní Chuilleanáin, The Sun-fish, Oldcastle, County Meath: Gallery Press
 Matthew Sweeney, Best of Irish Poetry 2010, Southword Editions, including work by Seamus Heaney, Michael Longley, Paul Muldoon, Michael McKimm, Leanne O'Sullivan, Leontia Flynn, Eva Bourke and Kerry Hardie
 Peggy O'Brien, Frog Spotting, 87 pages, Dedalus Press, 
 Stephen Roger Powers, The Follower's Tale, 100 pages, Cliffs of Moher, County Clare: Salmon Press, 
 Gabriel Rosenstock, Uttering Her Name, 126 pages, Cliffs of Moher, County Clare: Salmon Press, 
 A.E. Stringer, Human Costume, 100 pages, Cliffs of Moher, County Clare: Salmon Press, 
 Enda Wyley, To Wake to This, Dedalus Press,

New Zealand
 Stephanie de Montalk, Vivid Familiar, Victoria University Press 
 Jessica Le Bas Walking to Africa, Auckland University Press 
 Tusiata Avia, Bloodclot, Victoria University Press

Poets in Best New Zealand Poems
Poems from these 25 poets were selected by James Brown for Best New Zealand Poems 2008, published online this year:

 Johanna Aitchison
 Hinemoana Baker
 Emma Barnes
 David Beach
 Peter Bland

 Jenny Bornholdt
 Amy Brown
 Cliff Fell
 Joan Fleming
 Bernadette Hall

 Sam Hunt
 Lynn Jenner
 Michele Leggott
 Jean McCormack
 Emma Neale

 Gregory O'Brien
 Bob Orr
 Chris Orsman
 Richard Reeve
 Sam Sampson

 Kerrin P. Sharpe
 Tim Upperton
 Richard von Sturmer
 Tom Weston
 Sonja Yelich

United Kingdom

 James Byrne, Blood/Sugar, 
 Caroline Grigson, editor, The Life and Poems of Anne Hunter: Haydn's Tuneful Voice (Hunter, 1742–1821, wrote lyrics to much of Haydn's music) Liverpool University Press (Liverpool English Texts and Studies) 
 Brian Henry, Quarantine::Contagion, 
 Luke Kennard, The Migraine Hotel, Salt, 96 pages, 
 Herbert Lomas, A Casual Knack of Living: Collected Poems, contains all nine of the author's previous poetry books and one previously unpublished book of poems; 428 pages, 
 Sean O'Brien, Night Train (with artist Birtley Aris), Flambard Press
 Ruth Padel, Darwin: A Life in Poems, the author is his great-granddaughter
 Christopher Reid, A Scattering (2009 Costa Book Awards book of the year)
 Matthew Welton, We needed coffee but..., 96 pages, Carcanet Press,

Anthologies in the United Kingdom
 Gerard Carruthers, editor, Scottish Poems
 Fiona Sampson, editor, A Century of Poetry Review, Carcanet Press,

Criticism, scholarship and biography in the United Kingdom
 Zachary Leader, editor, The Movement Reconsidered: Essays on Larkin, Amis, Gunn, and Their Contemporaries, Oxford University Press (April 2009)
 Contemporary Poetry: Poets and Poetry since 1990 (Cambridge Contexts in Literature) Cambridge University Press, 1st edition

United States

 Sherman Alexie, Face, the author's first collection in nine years, Hanging Loose Press (April)
 Miguel Algarín, Survival Supervivencia, essays and poems
 Simone dos Anjos, Comedies, Iowa City, Iowa: Cosa Nostra Editions
 Philip Appleman, Karma, Dharma, Pudding & Pie Quantuck Lane Press (April)
 Rae Armantrout, Versed, winner of the National Book Critics Circle Award for Poetry and the 2010 Pulitzer Prize for Poetry; Wesleyan University Press
 Renée Ashley, Basic Heart
 Anny Ballardini, Ghost Dance in 33 Movements Otoliths, 
 Richard Bauch, These Extremes
 David Biespiel, The Book of Men and Women
 Jules Boykoff, Hegemonic Love Potion, Factory School, Brooklyn, New York
 Joel Brouwer, And So, Four Way, 
 Louis Cabri, that can’t, Nomados, Vancouver
 Gabrielle Calvocoressi, Apocalyptic Swing (August), Persea
 C. P. Cavafy, translated from the Greek by Daniel Mendelsohn:
 Collected Poems, Knopf, 
 The Unfinished Poems, C.P. Cavafy, 30 poems, left in various stages of completion by Cavafy when he died in 1933, discovered in the Cavafy Archive in the 1960s by George Savidis, the poet's editor, and published in a scholarly Greek edition by Renata Lavagnini in 1994; Knopf, 
 Kelly Cherry, The Retreats of Thought
 Florence Earle Coates (1850–1927), Victi Resurgunt. Published posthumously. A 26-page pamphlet of fifteen "fugitive" patriotic and war poems written by Mrs. Coates. The poems were originally published in various periodicals and texts between the years 1915 and 1922, and have been compiled and organized into pamphlet format. 
 Arda Collins, It Is Daylight, Louise Glück's sixth pick as judge of the Yale Series of Younger Poets competition; Yale University Press,  (April)
 Ben Doller, (né Doyle), FAQ, Ahsahta, 
 Rita Dove, Sonata Mulattica, Norton,  (April)
 Brett Evans, Slosh Models, Brooklyn: Factory School
 Sarah Gambito, Delivered (Persea), 
 Peter Ganick, arranger, White Sky Books, Puhos, Finland
 Molly Gaudry, We Take Me Apart: A Novel(la) [in verse], Mud Luscious Press
 Jack Gilbert, The Dance Most of All, Knopf,  (April)
 Jim Harrison, In Search of Small Gods, Copper Canyon Press (April)
 Michael Heller, Eschaton, Jersey City, New Jersey: Talisman House
 Leland Hickman, Tiresias: The Collected Poems of Leland Hickman, edited by Stephen Motika (Preface by Dennis Phillips and Afterwords by Bill Mohr), Nightboat Books
 Ernest Hilbert, Sixty Sonnets, Los Angeles: Red Hen.
 Geoffrey Hill, Selected Poems, Yale University Press, ; including "Mercian Hymns"
 Lucy Ives, My Thousand Novel, Iowa City, Iowa: Cosa Nostra Editions
 Stuart Taylor James, Heart Well Worn: The LWAs, 143 pages, PublishAmerica, Baltimore, MD, 
 Marilyn Kallet, Packing Light
 Erica Kaufman, Censory Impulse, Factory School, Brooklyn, New York
 Jesse Lee Kercheval, Cinema Muto
 Burt Kimmelman, As If Free, Talisman, Jersey City, New Jersey
 Natalie Knight, Archipelagos, Punch Press, Buffalo
 Jennifer Kronovet, Awayward, debut book of poetry, selected by Jean Valentine for BOA's A. Poulin Jr. prize; BOA, 

 Matthew Landis, Like a Moth From His Death Mouth, privately printed, Philadelphia
 Timothy Liu, Bending the Mind Around the Dream's Blown Fuse, Talisman House, Jersey City, New Jersey
 Lewis MacAdams, Lyrics, Palo Alto, California: Blue Press
 Randall Mann, Breakfast with Thom Gunn, University of Chicago Press, 
 Clay Matthews, Runoff, BlazeVOX, Buffalo, New York
 Campbell McGrath, Shannon, about the youngest member of the Lewis and Clark Expedition
 Barry McKinnon, In the Millennium, New Star Books, Vancouver BC / Point Roberts, Washington
 Deborah Meadows, Goodbye Tissues, Shearsman Books, Exeter, UK
 Didi Menendez, For Love of an Armadillo, GOSS 183:: Casa Menendez, Bloomington, Illinois
 Sheila Murphy & , How to Spell the Sound of Everything, Xerox Sutra Editions, West Lima, Wisconsin
Marilyn Nelson – Sweethearts of Rhythm: The Story Of The Greatest All-Girl Swing Band In The World
 Mary Oliver, Evidence, 44 poems, Beacon Press (April)
 Simon Pettet, Hearth, Talisman House, Jersey City, New Jersey
 D. A. Powell, Chronic, Graywolf Press, winner of the 2010 Kingsley Tufts Poetry Award
 Hilda Raz, What Happens
 Kit Robinson, The Messianic Trees: Selected Poems, 1976–2003, Adventures in Poetry, Princeton, New Jersey
 Ce Rosenow, Pacific, Mountain Gate Press, Hillsboro, Oregon
 Frederick Seidel, Poems 1959–2009, Farrar, Straus & Giroux,  (April)
 Mohammad Shaheen, translation from the original Arabic of the late Mahmoud Darwish, Almond Blossoms and Beyond, Interlink (March)
 Frank Sherlock, Over Here, Factory School, Brooklyn, New York
 Louis Simpson, Struggling Times. Rochester, New York: BOA Editions. . This is the Jamaica-born Simpson's 18th collection.
 Logan Ryan Smith, Tracks, Ypolita Press, San Francisco, California
 Elizabeth Swados, The One and Only Human Galaxy, Hanging Loose Press (April)
 Eleanor Ross Taylor, Captive Voices: New and Selected Poems
 Simon Thompson, Why Does It Feel So Late?, New Star Books, Vancouver BC / Point Roberts, Washington
 Sotère Torregian, Envoy, (preface by Andrew Joron), Punch Press, Buffalo, New York
 Pamela Ushuk, Crazy Love
 Fred Wah, The False Laws of Narrative: The Poetry of Fred Wah, selected with an introduction by Louis Cabri; Wilfrid Laurier University Press, Waterloo, Ontario, Canada
 Anne Waldman, Manatee/ Humanity, Penguin,  book-length poem taking its form and concerns from a Tibetan Buddhist ritual and from the poet's close encounter with a Manatee
 Keith Waldrop:
 Translator from the original French of Charles Baudelaire, Paris Spleen: Little Poems in Prose, Wesleyan University Press (May)
 Transcendental Studies: A Trilogy, University of California Press,  Waldrop has long been a major force in American avant-garde poetics, and this substantial new volume is big news indeed. Comprising three sequences—each almost a book in itself—plus an epilogue, and received the National Book Award (see below)
 Peter Waterhouse, Language Death Night Outside: Poem / Novel, translated by Rosmarie Waldrop; Burning Deck, Providence, Rhode Island
 Emily Wilson, Micrographia, title from Robert Hooke's 1665 scientific study of the natural world through a microscope; University of Iowa Press,

Anthologies in the United States
 David Lehman, general editor, David Wagoner, editor, The Best American Poetry 2009  (September 2009)
 David Yezzi, editor, Swallow Anthology of New American Poets, (University of Ohio Press, 2009), 
 Honor Moore, Poems from the Women's Movement (April), work from the 1960s, 1970s and 1980s, Library of America
Miekal And, editor, "Anthology Spidertangle", representative work of more than 50 visual poets, Xexoxial Editions

Criticism, scholarship and biography in the United States
 International Who's Who in Poetry 2009, Routledge, 
 Pierre Joris, Justifying the Margins, Salt Publishing, Cambridge, UK; essays, criticism via poetics

Poets in The Best American Poetry 2009
These poets appeared in The Best American Poetry 2009, with David Lehman, general editor, and David Wagoner, guest editor (who selected the poetry):

John Ashbery
Caleb Barber
Mark Bibbins
Bruce Bond
Marianne Boruch
Fleda Brown
Catherine Carter
Suzanne Cleary
Billy Collins
Rob Cook
James Cummins
Mark Doty
Denise Duhamel

Alice Friman
Margaret Gibson
Douglas Goetsch
Albert Goldbarth
Barbara Goldberg
Michael J. Grabell
Debora Greger
Jennifer Grotz
Barbara Hamby
Sarah Hannah
Jerry Harp
Jim Harrison

Dolores Hayden
Terrance Hayes
K. A. Hay
Bob Hicok
Daniel Hoffman
Richard Howard
P. Hurshell
Michael Johnson
Tina Kelley
Maud Kelly
Lance Larsen
Phillis Levin

Philip Levine
Sarah Lindsay
Thomas Lux
Joanie Mackowski
Christine Marshall
Cleopatra Mathis
J.D. McClatchy
W. S. Merwin
Jude Nutter
Sharon Olds
Mary Oliver
Linda Pastan
Kevin Prufer

Susan Blackwell Ramsey
Keith Ratzlaff
Adrienne Rich
James Richardson
Pattiann Rogers
Gibbons Ruark
John Rybicki
Betsy Sholl
Martha Silano
Mitch Sisskind
Tom Sleigh
Vincent Stanley

Pamela Sutton
Alexandra Teague
Craig Morgan Teicher
Natasha Trethewey
Derek Walcott
Jeanne Murray Walker
Ronald Wallace
Charles Harper Webb
Lisa Williams
Carolyne Wright
Debbie Yee
Kevin Young
Matthew Zapruder

Works published in other languages

French language

France
 Emily Dickinson, Poésies complètes, translated from the original English by Françoise Delphy; Flammarion
 Patrice Delbourg, editor, L'année poétique 2009 ("Poetry Year 2000"), French-language poetry published in the past 12 months, Publisher: Seghers; . an anthology
 Dominique Sorrente, Pays sous les continents, un itinéraire poétique 1978–2008, MLD
 Jean Max Tixier, Chants de l'évidence, publisher: Autres Temps,

French poetry in Canada
 Normand de Bellefeuille, Mon nom, Publisher: Éditions du Noroît; ; a finalist for the Governor General's Awards in French poetry
 René Lapierre, Traité de physique, Publisher: Les Herbes rouges; ; a finalist for the Governor General's Awards in French poetry
 Hélène Monette, Thérèse pour joie et orchestre, Publisher: Les Éditions du Boréal; ; a finalist for the Governor General's Awards in French poetry
 Philippe More, Brouillons pour un siècle abstrait, Publisher: Poètes de brousse; ; a finalist for the Governor General's Awards in French poetry
 André Roy, Montreal, Les espions de Dieu, Publisher: Les Herbes rouges; ; a finalist for the Governor General's Awards in French poetry

French poetry in Switzerland
 Markus Hediger, En deçà de la lumière, Publisher: Éditions de l'Aire;

German
 Christoph Buchwald, series editor, and Uljana Wolf, guest editor, Jahrbuch der Lyrik 2009 ("Yearbook of Poetry 2009"), including poems by Christian Ide Hintze, Herta Müller, Harald Hartung, Marcel Beyer; Frankfurt: Fischer (S.), 254 pages, an anthology
 Christoph Janacs, Die Zärtlichkeit von Stacheln; Salzburg: Tandem Edition
 Daniel Falb, Bancor, Kookbooks, 64 pages, 
 Monika Rinck (author, illustrator) and Andreas Töpfer (illustrator), Helle Verwirrung/Rincks Ding- und Tierleben: Gedichte & Zeichnungen ("Bright confusion/Rinck thing and animal life: Poems & Drawings"), Kookbooks, 200 pages, 
 Andre Rudolph (author) and Annette Kühn (illustrator), Fluglärm über den Palästen unsrer Restinnerlichkeit, Luxbooks, 130 pages, 
 Uljana Wolf, falsche freunde: Prosa-Gedichte ("false friends: Prose Poems"), Kookbooks, 85 pages,

Greece
 Phoebe Giannisi, Homerika, publisher: Kedros Editions
 Christoph Janacs, Zärtlichkeit mit Stacheln. Gedichte zu Adalbert Stifter ("The Tenderness of Quills: Poems by Adalbert Stifter"), Salzburg: Edition Tandem, 88 pages, 
 Giorgos Lillis, Bounds of the Labyrinth, publisher: Kedros Editions
 Yiannis Stigas,  Isopalo Travma  ("An Even Wound"), publisher: Kedros Editions
 Noveltly Within or Beyond Language, an anthology of young Greek poets, Athens: Gavriilidis Editions
 Christos Chrysoopoulos (Χρήστος Χρυσόοπουλος),  Η άλλη Λώρα ("Another Laura"), criticism; Athens: Kastaniotis

India
Listed in alphabetical order by first name:
 Bharat Majhi, Dho, Bhubaneswar: Timepass, India, Oriya-language
 K. Siva Reddy, Aame Evaraite Matram, Hyderabad: Palapitta Prachuranalu, Telugu-language
 Pratyush Guleri, editor and translator, Urvar Pradesh, New Delhi: Rajkamal Prakashan, anthology of poems translated from the original Himachali into Hindi
 S. Joseph, Uppante Kooval Varakkunnu, winner of a Thiruvananthapuram Book Fair award for one of the ten best books of this year; Kottayam: DC Books, ; Malayalam-language
 Teji Grover and Rustam Singh, Teji aur Rustam Ki Kavitaen, selected poems of both poets, New Delhi: Harper Collins, Hindi-language
 Venkatapu Satyam, translator, Antarjanam, translated into Kannada from the original Telugu of K. Siva Reddy; Bangalore: Kannada Prakashana

Nepal

Poland
 Juliusz Erazm Bolek, Sens-or
 Tadeusz Dąbrowski, Czarny kwadrat, winner of the 2009 Koscielski Foundation Prize (popularly known in Poland as the nagrodą Kościelskich, or "Koscielski award") for works by Polish writers under 40 years old
 Jerzy Jarniewicz, Makijaż (Make-up) Wrocław: Biuro Literackie
 Ryszard Krynicki, Wiersze wybrane; Kraków: Wydawnictwo a5
 Piotr Sommer, Rano na ziemi
 Wisława Szymborska, Tutaj ("Here")
 Eugeniusz Tkaczyszyn-Dycki, Rzeczywiste i nierzeczywiste staje się jednym ciałem.111 wierszy
 Adam Zagajewski, Unseen Hand (Niewidzialna ręka), Kraków: Znak

Portuguese language
 Rosa Lia Dinelle, Enquanto os sinos plangem, poems in many different styles; Brazil
 Carlos Newton Júnior, editor, O cangaço na poesia brasileira, anthology; Brazil
 Arménio Vieira, O poema, a viagem, o sonho, Portugal

Russia
Books of poetry were published this year by Igor Bulatovsky, Ilya Kucherov, Dmitry Grigoryev, Natalya Chernykh, Aleksey Porvin, Boris Khersonsky, Aleksandr Mironov, Gali-Dana Singer and Vadim Mesyats

Other languages
 Antonio Gamoneda, Extravío en la luz ("Lost in the light"), Madrid: Casariego, six previously unpublished poems, Spain
 Jorge Volpi, Oscuro bosque oscuro, novel in free verse, Spanish poetry-language, Mexico
 Rahman Henry, Traansundoree ( A Book of Poems), Bhashachitra, Dhaka, Bangladesh.
 Toyo Shibata – Kujikenaide (″Don't lose heart″), Japan

Awards and honors
Awards announced this year:

International
Golden Wreath of Poetry: Tomaž Šalamun (Slovenia)

Australia awards and honors
 C. J. Dennis Prize for Poetry:
 Kenneth Slessor Prize for Poetry:

Canada awards and honors
 Lampman-Scott Award: David O'Meara, Noble Gas, Penny Black
 Gerald Lampert Award: Katia Grubisic, what if red ran out
 Griffin Poetry Prize: Canadian: A. F. Moritz, for The Sentinel
 Others on the shortlist: Kevin Connolly, Revolver; Jeramy Dodds, Crabwise to the Hounds
 Griffin Poetry Prize: International, in the English Language: C.D. Wright, Rising, Falling, Hovering
 Others on the shortlist: Mick Imlah, The Lost Leader; Derek Mahon, Life on Earth; Dean Young, Primitive Mentor
Governor General's Award for English language poetry: David Zieroth, The Fly in Autumn
 Others on the shortlist: David McFadden, Be Calm, Honey, Philip Kevin Paul, Little Hunger; Sina Queyras, Expressway; Carmine Starnino, This Way Out
Governor General's Award for French language poetry: Hélène Monette, Thérèse pour joie et orchestre
 Others on the shortlist: Normand de Bellefeuille, Mon nom; René Lapierre, Traité de physique; Philippe More, Brouillons pour un siècle abstrait; André Roy, Les espions de Dieu
 Pat Lowther Award: Alice Major, The Office Tower Tales
 Prix Alain-Grandbois: Monique Deland, Miniatures, balles perdues et autres désordres
 Dorothy Livesay Poetry Prize: Daphne Marlatt, The Given
 Prix Émile-Nelligan: François Turcot, Cette maison n'est pas la mienne

India awards and honors
Sahitya Akademi Award : Kailash Vajpayee for Hawa Mein Hastakshar (Hindi)

New Zealand awards and honors
 Prime Minister's Awards for Literary Achievement (poetry): Brian Turner
 Montana New Zealand Book Awards: 
 Poetry category winner: Jenny Bornholdt, The Rocky Shore
 NZSA Jessie Mackay Best First Book Award for Poetry: Everything Talks by Sam Sampson (Auckland University Press)

United Kingdom awards and honors
 Cholmondeley Award: Bernard O'Donoghue, Alice Oswald, Fiona Sampson, Pauline Stainer
 Costa Award (formerly "Whitbread Awards") for poetry:
 Shortlist:
 David Cohen Prize: Seamus Heaney
 English Association's Fellows' Poetry Prizes:
 Eric Gregory Award (for a collection of poems by a poet under the age of 30): Liz Berry, James Brookes, Swithun Cooper, Alex McRae, Sam Riviere
 Forward Poetry Prize:
Best Collection: Don Paterson, Rain
Shortlist: Peter Porter; Christopher Reid, A Scattering
Best First Collection:
Shortlist:
 Jerwood Aldeburgh First Collection Prize for poetry:
Shortlist:
 Manchester Poetry Prize:
 Michael Marks Awards for Poetry Pamphlets (first award): Elizabeth Burns, The Shortest Days
 National Poet of Wales:
 National Poetry Competition 2008:
 T. S. Eliot Prize (United Kingdom and Ireland): Jen Hadfield, Nigh-No-Place
Shortlist (announced in November 2008):
 The Times/Stephen Spender Prize for Poetry Translation:

United States awards and honors
 Agnes Lynch Starrett Poetry Prize awarded to Bobby C. Rogers for Paper Anniversary
 AML Award for poetry to Lance Larsen for Backyard Alchemy
 O. B. Hardison, Jr. Poetry Prize: Juliana Spahr  Judges: Claudia Rankine and Joshua Weiner
 Lenore Marshall Poetry Prize: Linda Gregg                           
 Los Angeles Times Book Prize: Brenda Hillman, Practical Water (Wesleyan University Press)
 National Book Award for Poetry: Keith Waldrop for Transcendental Studies: A Trilogy
 National Book Critics Circle Award for Poetry: Rae Armantrout for Versed
 Finalists: Louise Glück, A Village Life, D.A. Powell, Chronic, Eleanor Ross Taylor Captive Voices, Rachel Zucker, Museum of Accidents
 The New Criterion Poetry Prize: William Virgil Davis for Landscape and Journey
 PEN Award for Poetry in Translation: Marilyn Hacker for her translation from the French of King of a Hundred Horsemen by Marie Étienne
 Pulitzer Prize for Poetry (United States): W.S. Merwin for The Shadow of Sirius
 Finalists: Frank Bidart, Watching the Spring Festival, and Ruth Stone, What Love Comes To: New & Selected Poems
 Randall Jarrell Award in Poetry Criticism: Ange Mlinko
 Ruth Lilly Poetry Prize: Fanny Howe
 Wallace Stevens Award: Louise Glück
 Whiting Awards: Jericho Brown, Jay Hopler, Joan Kane

From the Poetry Society of America
 Frost Medal: X.J. Kennedy
 Shelley Memorial Award: Ron Padgett and Gary Young; Judges: John Koethe and Christopher Buckley
 Writer Magazine/Emily Dickinson Award: Richard Robbins; Judge: Graham Foust

 Lyric Poetry Award: Susan Kinsolving; Judge: Lucie Brock-Broido
 Lucille Medwick Memorial Award: Wayne Miller; Judge: Elizabeth Alexander; finalist:
 Alice Fay Di Castagnola Award: Melissa Kwasny; Judge: Ed Roberson; finalists:
 Louise Louis/Emily F. Bourne Student Poetry Award: Grace Dunhame; Judge: Matthew Rohrer; finalists:
 George Bogin Memorial Award: Rusty Morrison; Judge: John Yau
 Robert H. Winner Memorial Award: Eliot Khalil Wilson; Judge: Henri Cole; finalists:
 Cecil Hemley Memorial Award: Melissa Kwasny; Judge: Mei-mei Berssenbrugge
 Norma Farber First Book Award: Richard Deming for Let's Not Call It Consequence; Judge: Martha Ronk
 William Carlos Williams Award: Linda Gregg for  All of It Singing; Judge: James Longenbach; finalists:

From the Poetry Society of Virginia Student Poetry Contest

2009 Student Poetry Contest Winners :: S-3 Category – Grades 5 & 6
1st place Eloise H. Kelley, Edgecomb, Maine for the poem "One Unique World"
2nd place Eliza D’Anieri, Edgecomb, Maine for the poem "Piano Images"
3rd place Cullan Kerner, Winchester, Virginia for the poem "Benched"
1st Honorable Mention Graydon Nuk, Edgecomb, Maine for the poem "The Bike"
2nd Honorable Mention Josephine Norris Cotton, Edgecomb, Maine for the poem "A Cat's Personality"
3rd Honorable Mention Sophia Rose Carbonneau, Edgecomb, Maine for the poem "Florida's Smiles"

2009 Student Poetry Contest Winners :: S-4 Category – Grades 7 & 8
1st place Nate Friant, Harbor, Maine for the poem "November Jay"
2nd place Ashley Harris, Mt. Kisco, NY for the poem "Lines"
3rd place Emma Moorhead, Bath, Maine for the poem "My Crayola"
1st Honorable Mention Lia Russell, Richmond, Virginia for the poem "Dogwood"
2nd Honorable Mention Amelia Neilson, Arrowsic, Maine for the poem "Harvested"

2009 Student Poetry Contest Winners :: S-5 Category – Grades 9 & 10
1st place Cassandra Gergely, Owings, Maryland for the poem "Sun Dreams"
2nd place Kelsey Tripp, Roanoke, Virginia for the poem "Clarity"
3rd place Aleck Berry, Williamsburg, Virginia for the poem "Golden Fried Love"

2009 Student Poetry Contest Winners :: S-6 Category – Grades 11 & 12
1st place Duncan Lyle, Manakin Sabot, Virginia for the poem "Smoking is not allowed in School"
2nd place Bianca LaBarbena, Edison, New Jersey for the poem "Haven"
3rd place Keenan Nathaniel Thompson, Richmond, Virginia for the poem "Sunflower Angel"
1st Honorable Mention Brown Farinholt, Richmond, Virginia for the poem "Your Temple"
2nd Honorable Mention Kara Wang, Saratoga, California for the poem "Longing"

2009 Student Poetry Contest Winners :: S-7 Category – Community College
1st place Tyler Iseley, Newport News, Virginia for the poem "Warrior"
2nd place Linda Arnott, Tucson, Arizona for the poem "The Corpse"

2009 Student Poetry Contest Winners :: S-8 Category – Undergraduate College
1st place Nathan W. Friedman, Roanoke, Virginia for the poem "Like Clara Bow"
2nd place Nicole Fegeas, Warrenton, Virginia for the poem "Semantics"
3rd place Audrey Walls, Richmond, Virginia for the poem "Piedmont Station"

2009 Student Poetry Contest Winners :: Poetry Society Prize
1st place Abbie Hinchman, Edgecomb, Maine for the poem "Where My Poems Hide"
2nd place Sophia Rose Carbonneau, Edgecomb, Maine for the poem "How to be in a Play"
3rd place Maura Eileen Anderson, Edgecomb, Maine for the poem "Late Night Wing: An Alphabet Poem"
1st Honorable Mention Daniel Mayer, Walpole, Maine for the poem "My Ascent and Descent"
2nd Honorable Mention Jacob Maxmin, Nobleboro, Maine for the poem "Holiday Helpers"
3rd Honorable Mention Virginia Hindman, Edgecomb, Maine for the poem "Ignorance"

2009 Student Poetry Contest Winners :: Jenkins Prize
1st place Kelsey Tripp, Roanoke, Virginia for the poem "Suppressed Voice"
2nd place Mikal Cardine, Warrington, Virginia for the poem "Lost"
3rd place Robyn Walters, Yorktown, Virginia for the poem "For the Love of Book"

2009 Student Poetry Contest Winners :: Virginia Student Prize
1st place Brown Farinholt, Richmond, Virginia for the poem "Henrietta's"
2nd place Mikal Cardine, Warrington, Virginia for the poem "Lonely"
3rd place Michelle Moses, Virginia Beach, Virginia for the poem "Novelty Love"
1st Honorable Mention Sam Perry, Dillwyn, Virginia for the poem "The Musician"
2nd Honorable Mention Philip Halsey, Richmond, Virginia for the poem "Spoiled"
3rd Honorable Mention Peter Chiappa, Yorktown, Virginia for the poem "Sonnet 31"

Awards and honors elsewhere
 Poland:
 Gdynia Literary Prize, for poetry: Eugeniusz Tkaczyszyn-Dycki, Piosenka o zależnościach i uzależnieniach (2008)
 Nike Award for literature: Eugeniusz Tkaczyszyn-Dycki, Piosenka o zależnościach i uzależnieniach
 Portuguese: Camões Prize: Arménio Vieira
 Spain: Cervantes Prize: José Emilio Pacheco, Mexico

Deaths
Birth years link to the corresponding "[year] in poetry" article:
 January 2 – Inger Christensen, 73 (born 1935), Danish poet, writer, novelist, essayist and children's book author
 January 4 – Gert Jonke, 62, (born 1946), Austrian poet, novelist playwright and screenwriter, of cancer
 January 10 – Mario Augusto Rodriguez Velez, 92 (born 1917), Panamanian journalist, essayist, dramatist, poet and storyteller, of a heart ailment (surname: Rodriguez Velez)
 January 11 – Milan Rufus, 80 (born 1928), Slovak poet and academic
 January 12 – Mick Imlah, 52 (born 1956), British poet
 January 13 – W. D. Snodgrass, 83 (born 1926), American poet and academic
 January 15 – Maurice Chappaz, 92 (born 1916), Swiss, French-language poet, writer and translator
 January 18 – Grigore Vieru, 73 (born 1935), a Moldovan poet writing in Romanian, strong promoter of the Romanian language in Moldova; died from a car accident
 January 27 – John Updike, 76 (born 1932), American novelist, short story writer, essayist, poet and writer
 January 30 – James Schevill, 88 (born 1920), American poet, critic, playwright and professor at San Francisco State and Brown University
 February 4 – Arnljot Eggen, (born 1923), Norwegian poet, playwright and author of children's books
 February 5 – Subedar Mahmoodmiya Mohammad Imam, popularly known as "Asim Randeri", 104 (born 1904), Indian, Gujarati-language ghazal poet
 February 9:
 Kazys Bradūnas, 91, Lithuanian poet and editor
 Don Maclennan, 80 (born 1929), English-born South African poet, critic and academic
 February 13 – Bahtiyar Vahabzade (born 1925), Azerbaijani poet, philologist
 February 20 – Christopher Nolan, 43 (born 1965), Irish poet and author
 February 23 – Peter Wild, 68, (born 1940), American poet and historian, professor at the University of Arizona in Tucson
 February 25 – Bill Holm, 65 (born 1943), American poet, writer and academic, from complications of pneumonia
 March 4 – Triztán Vindtorn (born 1942), Norwegian poet and performance artist
 March 12 – Blanca Varela, 82 (born 1926), Peruvian poet
 March 13 – James Purdy, 94, (born 1914), American novelist, poet and playwright
 March 14 – Gwendoline Konie, 70 (born 1938), Zambian poet and politician
 March 17 – Jane Mayhall, 90, (born 1918), American poet and novelist
 April 3 – Alexei Parshchikov, 54,(born 1954), Russian poet, critic and translator
 April 8 – Henri Meschonnic, 77, (born 1932), French poet, linguist, translator and theoretician
 April 10 – Deborah Digges (born 1950), American poet and academic
 April 12 – Franklin Rosemont (born 1943), American Surrealist poet, labor historian and co-founder of the Chicago Surrealist Group
 April 13 – Stefan Brecht (born 1924), 84, German-born American poet, critic and scholar of theater; son of Bertolt Brecht and Helene Weigel
 April 28 – U. A. Fanthorpe (born 1929), 79, English poet
 April 29, but date uncertain – Craig Arnold (born 1967), 41, American poet, fell climbing a volcano in Japan while collecting material for his next book.
 May 1 –3 – Bantu Mwaura, 40, Kenyan human-rights activist, actor, director, poet and storyteller who wrote poetry in English, Swahili and Gikuyu
 May 7 – Robin Blaser, (born 1925), 83, American-born Canadian poet, Griffin Poetry Prize winner
 May 10 – James Kirkup, 91, English poet, translator and travel writer, from a stroke
 May 17 – Mario Benedetti, 88 (born 1920), Uruguayan, poet, author and journalist
 May 22 – Alexander Mezhirov, 86 (born 1923), Russian poet, translator and critic
 May 26 – Doris Mühringer, 88 (born 1920), Austrian poet, short story writer and children's writer
 May 31 – Kamala Das, 75 (born 1934), Indian short-story writer and poet who wrote in English and Malayalam
 June 3 – David Bromige, 75 (born 1933), English-born Canadian poet who resided in California, winner of the Pushcart Prize.
 June 8:
 Harold Norse, 92 (born 1916), American poet and memoirist. Considered among Beat poets.
 Habib Tanvir, 85 (born 1923), popular Hindi playwright, theatre director, poet and actor
 June 24 – Steven Wells, 49 (born 1960), English music critic, journalist, screenwriter, poet, novelist, film producer and publisher
 July 3 – Alauddin Al-Azad, 77 (born 1932), Bengali novelist, writer, poet, literary critic and academic
 August 6 – Wahyu Sulaiman Rendra, born Willibrordus Surendra Broto Rendra, popularly known as W. S. Rendra and also known as "Si Burung Merak" and "The Peacock", 74 (born 1935), Indonesian poet
 August 8 – Alfonso Calderón, 78 (born 1930), Chilean poet, writer, memoirist and poetry anthologist
 August 16 – Alistair Campbell, 84 (born 1925), New Zealand poet, writer and editor, and once the husband of fellow poet Fleur Adcock
 August 19:
 Dic Jones, 75, Welsh poet
 Lina Kasdagli (also spelled "Lina Kasdaglē"), 88 (born 1912), Greek poet and translator
 August 27 – Sergey Mikhalkov, 96 (born 1913), Russian writer and poet, co-author of the lyrics of the National Anthem of the Soviet Union and National Anthem of Russia
 September 3 – Christine D'Haen, 85, Belgian poet
 September 11:
Sarane Alexandrian, 82, French art historian, philosopher and poet
 Jim Carroll, 59 (born 1949), American poet, author and musician.
 September 15 – Wayne Brown, 65 (born 1944), Trinidadian writer and poet
 September 27 – Gaya Prasad Tiwari, 89, Hindi poet in India and twice winner of the Hindi Sahitya Akademi Award, died after being hit by a train as he was crossing the tracks (hard of hearing, he apparently did not hear the train coming)
 September 30 – Rafael Arozarena, 86, Spanish writer and poet.
 October 1 – Cintio Vitier, 88, Cuban
 October 18 – Lenore Kandel, 77, American, died of lung cancer
 November 1 – Alda Merini, 78, Italian.
 November 15 – Anna Mendelssohn, 61, British poet and political activist, brain tumour
 December 10 – Dilip Chitre, 71 (born 1938), Indian writer who wrote in Marathi and English. He was also a painter and filmmaker. His Ekun Kavita or Collected Poems were published in the 1990s. His most famous translation is of the celebrated 17th century Marathi bhakti poet Tukaram.
 December 20 – Vera Rich, 73 (born 1936), British poet, journalist, historian, and translator
 December 24 – Jim Chastain, 46 (born 1963), American poet,
 December 24/25? – Rachel Wetzsteon, 42 (born 1967), American poet, poetry editor of The New Republic at the time of her death, from suicide
 December 26 – Dennis Brutus, 85 (born 1924), South African poet and anti-Apartheid activist. He was imprisoned and incarcerated in the cell next to Nelson Mandela's on Robben Island from 1963 to 1965.
 December 30 –Ruth Lilly, 94, American philanthropist (Eli Lilly and Company), established $100,000 Ruth Lilly Poetry Prize and donated $200 million to Poetry magazine

See also

Poetry
List of poetry awards

Notes

 Britannica Book of the Year 2010 (events of 2009), published by the Encyclopædia Britannica, online edition (subscription required), "Literature/Year in Review 2009" section

2000s in poetry
Poetry